Ayalon (‘place of deer’) is the name of an Israeli placename and a Hebrew family name. It is the modern transliteration of Ajalon. It may refer to the following:

Places
Ayalon Valley, a valley and Biblical town in Israel and Palestine
Ayalon Prison, a prison in Israel that reportedly held "Prisoner X"
Ayalon Cave, a cave near Ramla, Israel
Ayalon River, a small, mostly dried-out river in Israel
Machon Ayalon, a bullet factory disguised as a kibbutz near Ayalon
Highway 20 (Israel) (Ayalon Highway), a major freeway in Israel

People
Ami Ayalon, an Israeli politician and retired IDF general
Danny Ayalon, an Israeli diplomat and former ambassador to the United States

See also 
 Eilon